The Glob is the name of different fictional characters appearing in American comic books published by Marvel Comics.

Publication history
The first Glob debuted in The Incredible Hulk vol. 2 #121 (Nov. 1969), and was created by Roy Thomas and Herb Trimpe. Roy Thomas has stated that the character was a conscious imitation of the Heap. Thomas intended to call the character the Shape, but editor Stan Lee thought that name sounded too feminine, and insisted on the name "the Glob".

The second Glob debuted in The Incredible Hulk vol. 2 #389 and was created by Tom Field and Gary Barker.

Fictional character biography

Joseph "Joe" Timms
Joe Timms was born in Miami, Florida. Timms is a petty criminal who escaped from prison to see his dying wife, until he drowned in the swamp bog for several years. Then, nuclear waste brought him back to life as a large, slimy, and shambling monster named the Glob, with immense strength, but with very little brainpower. It terrorized Betty Ross, fought the Hulk, and got dissolved by an experimental anti-radiation fluid in the murky waters. Shortly thereafter, the Leader resurrected it for a second battle against the Hulk. An explosion blew up the Glob into tiny fragments.

The Glob's brain later reformed into the Golden Brain. Yagzan and the Cult of Entropy used it as a weapon, but lost by the Entropists in an encounter with the Man-Thing. The Golden Brain psionically molded itself into an amnesiac blond-haired man. The man had been captured and mutated by Yagzan into a clay-based lifeform of the Glob. It battled the Man-Thing, reducing itself to mud again, which suffocates Yagzan, and killed him.

However, it was later revealed that the Glob had been enslaved by the Collector. It eventually rebelled against him with the assistance of the Hulk and the Man-Thing.

The Glob then got taken into S.H.I.E.L.D. custody where they recruited it in their organization's Paranormal Containment Unit.

During the "Avengers: Standoff!" storyline, the Glob became an inmate of Pleasant Hill, a gated community established by S.H.I.E.L.D.

Sumner Samuel Beckwith
Sumner Samuel Beckwith was a geneticist working for the Pantheon that injected himself with an experimental duplicate of the Super-Soldier Serum in which he created (after discovering the journals of Ted Sallis, who becomes the Man-Thing due to his own research in recreating the formula), turns out to be defective. He transformed into a light-green semi-humanoid being seemingly composed of bog matter known as the Glob II. It fled to the Florida Everglades, menaced Rick Jones and even battled the Hulk, who mistook it for the original Glob. It got incinerated by the Man-Thing's touch after feeling fear.

Powers and abilities
Both the Globs were monstrous creatures resembling a semi-solid mass of vegetable matter, with inhuman strength, stamina, and durability, though limited in brainpower and athletics. The Globs' bodies are difficult to harm, because their muddy exteriors can absorb physical attacks painlessly.

Joe Timms became the first Glob as a result from exposure to toxic waste in the swamp. As the Golden Brain, it has the ability to materialize an electrically-charged duplicate of its Glob form and recreate a physically perfect human body for itself.

Sumner Beckwith became the second Glob when he injected himself with a duplicate version of the Super-Soldier Formula. Unlike the original, it could excrete slime-like material from its own body to smother living beings or regenerate lost limbs. He earned a Ph.D. in genetics, before his transformation.

Other characters named Glob
There have been three other characters known as Glob in the Marvel Universe. These include:

 The Glob, an imaginary flaming monster from Strange Tales #88.
 The Glop, who was originally known as the Glob in Journey into Mystery #72.
 Glob Herman, a student at the Xavier Institute.

Reception
The Glob was ranked #31 on a listing of Marvel Comics' monster characters.

References

External links
 
 
 Glob at Marvel.com

Characters created by Herb Trimpe
Characters created by Roy Thomas
Comics characters introduced in 1969
Comics characters introduced in 1992
Fictional characters from Miami
Fictional characters with superhuman durability or invulnerability
Fictional geneticists
Fictional monsters
Fictional mute characters
Fictional superorganisms
Marvel Comics characters who have mental powers
Marvel Comics characters with accelerated healing
Marvel Comics characters with superhuman strength
Marvel Comics mutates
Marvel Comics scientists
Marvel Comics supervillains
Marvel Comics undead characters